Year's Best Science Fiction Novels: 1953 is a 1953 anthology of science fiction novels and novellas edited by E. F. Bleiler and T. E. Dikty.  An abridged edition was published in the UK by The Bodley Head in 1955 under the title Category Phoenix. The stories had originally appeared in 1952 in the magazines Astounding, Galaxy Science Fiction and Thrilling Wonder Stories.

Contents

 Introduction, by Everett F. Bleiler & T. E. Dikty
 "Firewater", by William Tenn
 "Category Phoenix", by Boyd Ellanby
 "Surface Tension", by James Blish
 "The Gadget Had a Ghost", by Murray Leinster
 "Conditionally Human", by Walter M. Miller, Jr.

Reception
P. Schuyler Miller noted that the editors selected stories "for variety as much as 'importance,' literary elegance, or any other such self-conscious quality."

References

1953 anthologies
Year's Best Science Fiction Novels anthology series